Francis Leonard Tombs, Baron Tombs (17 May 1924 – 11 April 2020) was an English industrialist and politician who served as a crossbench member of the House of Lords from 1990 until his retirement in 2015.

Biography
He was educated at Elmore Green School, Walsall, and at the University of London. Tombs had a career in industry, particularly in electricity generation. He was chairman of the South of Scotland Electricity Board, the Electricity Council and Rolls-Royce. Tombs was president of the Institution of Electrical Engineers in 1981 and became an Honorary Fellow of its successor organisation the Institution of Engineering and Technology in 1991. Tombs was named chairman of Turner & Newall P.L.C., Britain's largest manufacturer of asbestos products on 30 November 1982, and remained there throughout much of the 1980s.

Knighted in 1978, Tombs was created a life peer on 29 February 1990, as Baron Tombs, of Brailes in the County of Warwickshire. He sat in the House of Lords as a crossbencher, and was on a number of committees. Tombs was granted a leave of absence in March 2008, which lasted until July 2010. He wrote a memoir, Power Politics: Political Encounters in Industry and Engineering, which was published later that year. Tombs retired from the House of Lords on 31 March 2015. He died in April 2020, at the age of 95.

References

1924 births
2020 deaths
Alumni of the University of London
Crossbench life peers
English electrical engineers
Knights Bachelor
Rolls-Royce people
Life peers created by Elizabeth II